No Holds Barred is a live album by American band Biohazard. It is the first to feature former Helmet guitarist Rob Echeverria, who had joined the band for the Mata Leão tour.

Track listing

Personnel
Evan Seinfeld – vocals, bass
Billy Graziadei – vocals, guitar
Danny Schuler – drums, percussion
Rob Echeverria – guitar

References

Biohazard (band) albums
Roadrunner Records live albums
Albums recorded at Markthalle Hamburg
1997 live albums